Path of Hope is a 1950 Italian language drama film directed by Pietro Germi that belongs to the  Italian neorealism film movement. It is based on Nino Di Maria's novel Cuori negli abissi.  Federico Fellini co-wrote the script. In July 2021, the film was shown in the Cannes Classics section at the 2021 Cannes Film Festival.

Plot
The film presents the travel of a group of poor Sicilians to France in their dreams of a better life.

Women wait anxiously at a minehead in Capodarso, Sicily. Their men are underground. The mine is closing and the miners refuse to come up unless the owner relents. After three days, they give up in despair... In a bar in town, Ciccio is recruiting workers for jobs in France. He can get people over the border — for L20,000 a head. Enough people to fill a bus, having sold their belongings to pay the fee, including Saro and his three young children, and Barbara and her man Vanni, who's in trouble with the law and desperate to flee Italy.

After reaching Naples by train, Ciccio tries to slip away but is grabbed by Vanni. Vanni tells Barbara where to meet at the border if anything should go wrong. In Rome, Ciccio points out Vanni to the police. In the shoot-out, both Vanni and Ciccio escape. The others are arrested. They are ordered by the police to return to Sicily or be charged with "illegal expatriation".

With Saro as leader, and nearly out of money, they head north instead. Hardship draws Saro and Barbara closer together.

Cast
 Raf Vallone - Saro Cammarata
 Elena Varzi - Barbara Spadaro
 Saro Urzì - Ciccio Ingaggiatore
 Franco Navarra - Vanni
 Liliana Lattanzi - Rosa
 Mirella Ciotti - Lorenza
 Saro Arcidiacono - Accountant
 Francesco Tomalillo - Misciu (as Francesco Tomolillo)
 Paolo Reale - Brasi
 Giuseppe Priolo - Luca
 Renato Terra - Mommino
 Carmela Trovato - Cirmena
 Angelo Grasso - Antonio
 Assunta Radico - Beatificata
 Francesca Russella - Grandmother

Awards
Wins
 1st Berlin International Film Festival - Silver Bear

Nominations
 1951 Cannes Film Festival - Palme d'Or

References

External links

1950 films
1950s Italian-language films
1950 drama films
Films set in Sicily
Films set in Italy
Italian neorealist films
Films directed by Pietro Germi
Films with screenplays by Federico Fellini
Films with screenplays by Luciano Vincenzoni
Films about illegal immigration
Lux Film films
Italian drama films
Italian black-and-white films
1950s Italian films